The Chilbolton Observatory is a facility for atmospheric and radio research located on the edge of the village of Chilbolton near Stockbridge in Hampshire, England.  The facilities are run by the STFC Radio Communications Research Unit of the Rutherford Appleton Laboratory and form part of the Science and Technology Facilities Council.

Overview 

The Chilbolton Observatory operates many pieces of research equipment associated with radar propagation and meteorology. , these include:
 An S band Doppler weather radar with its distinctive, fully steerable, 25 metre parabolic antenna. This equipment can be referred to as CAMRa (Chilbolton Advanced Meteorological Radar).
 An L band Clear-air radar
 A W band bistatic zenith radar
 A UV Raman Lidar
 Multiple Ka band radiometers
 Multiple rain gauges

The observatory also hosts the UK's LOFAR station.

Timeline of projects 

 1998 - CLARE'98 Cloud Lidar and Radar experiment, which eventually fed into the European Space Agency EarthCARE programme
 2001 to 2004 - CLOUDMAP2 project to assist in Numerical weather prediction models
 2006 - Chilbolton Observatory joined forces with several European Space Agency sites to verify the L band radio transmissions from the GIOVE-A satellite
 2006 - NERC Cirrus and Anvils: European Satellite and Airborne Radiation measurements project
 2008 - In-Orbit Test (IOT) performed for GIOVE-B
 2008-9 - APPRAISE, during which the CAMRa and Lidar were used to direct airborne measurements in mixed-phase clouds
 2010 - LOFAR station UK608 constructed

History 

Construction of Chilbolton Observatory started in 1963. It was built partially on the site of RAF Chilbolton, which was decommissioned in 1946. Several sites around the south-east of England were considered for the construction. The site at Chilbolton, on the edge of Salisbury Plain, was chosen in part because of excellent visibility of the horizon and its relative remoteness from major roads whose cars could cause interference.

The facility was opened in April 1967. Within several months of being commissioned the azimuth bearing of the antenna suffered a catastrophic failure. GEC were contracted to repair the bearing and devised a system to replace the failed part while leaving the 400 tonne dish ostensibly in-place.

Originally, the antenna was engaged in Ku band radio astronomy, but now operates as a S and L band radar.

References

External links

 Chilbolton Observatory Facilities retrieved May 17, 2006
 CLOUDMAP2 project homepage
 ESA News 'GIOVE A transmits loud and clear', ESA Portal - Improving Daily Life, March 9, 2006, retrieved May 17, 2006

Astronomical observatories in England
Buildings and structures in Hampshire
Low-Frequency Array (LOFAR)
Research institutes in Hampshire
Science and Technology Facilities Council
Space Situational Awareness Programme
Test Valley
Weather radars
Meteorological observatories